Gymnasium illustre may refer to
Ernestine Gymnasium, Gotha
Eberhard-Ludwigs-Gymnasium, Stuttgart